John Patrick De Sena (born December 6, 1987), better known by his stage name Jack DeSena, is an American actor. He is best known for his work on the sketch comedy series All That, for the voice work of Sokka on the Nickelodeon series Avatar: The Last Airbender, and for the voice work of Callum on the Netflix series The Dragon Prince.

Biography
De Sena was born in Boston, Massachusetts. His family moved to Irvine, California in 1999, where he attended Irvine High School. After, he attended UCLA. He  was a very active member of the international ComedySportz troupe (a comic improvisation team that participates in games as seen on Whose Line Is It Anyway?). Having joined All Thats cast at the start of its 7th season in 2002, he subsequently tied with Logan Lerman for the 2005 Young Artist Award for Best Performance in a TV Series (Comedy or Drama) - Leading Young Actor. He rapidly gained recognition for his skilled and clever ad-libbing from his work as Sokka on Avatar and also guest starred as Jimmy Olsen in The Batman.

De Sena worked on the online mockumentary web series Dorm Life, a 2008 Webby Honoree for Best Writing and Comedy: Individual Short or Episode. De Sena appeared on an episode of King of the Hill, "Luanne Gets Lucky." De Sena has also appeared in an episode of Generator Rex, "Crash and Burn." In 2012, De Sena appeared on the Hulu original series Battleground. In 2013, he appeared as the judge of the texting competition and later as an airport investigator on the Nickelodeon sitcom Sam & Cat. In 2014, he voiced Robin in the animated film JLA Adventures: Trapped in Time.

He is also known as "Mr. Roberts" in the TV series 100 Things to Do Before High School, a role he played from 2014 to 2016.

Since January 19, 2016, he and his long time friend Chris W. Smith have been creating and starring in comedy sketches on their YouTube channel "Chris and Jack". New sketches are uploaded to the channel on the first Thursday of every month.

He is currently the voice of Callum on the Netflix animated series The Dragon Prince, which premiered on September 14, 2018.

He is an avid New York Knicks fan.

Filmography

Film

Television

Video games

Podcasts

References

External links

1987 births
Living people
American male child actors
American male television actors
American male voice actors
American people of Italian descent
Male actors from Boston